Way 2 Fonky is the second studio album by American hip hop artist and producer DJ Quik, released by Profile Records on July 20, 1992. Recording sessions for the album took place during 1991 and 1992. Production was handled by DJ Quik and was executive produced Courtney Branch and Tracy Kendrick.

The album debuted at number ten on the US Billboard 200 chart on August 8, 1992, selling 120,000 copies in its first week in the United States. The album was certified Gold three months after its release on October 9, 1992 by the RIAA.

Background
DJ Quik was beefing with rapper Tim Dog during this time who dissed him on three tracks "Fuck Compton", "Step To Me",and "DJ Quik Beat Down (Skit)" on his album Penicillin on Wax. He responded to Tim Dog with disses on "Way 2 Fonky" and "Tha Last Word". He was also beefing with MC Eiht; the two had already been beefing for a few years at the time. Tim Dog responded to DJ Quik with "I Don't Give a Fuck" and "Breakin' North" (which is the same shout-out type song like "Tha Last Word") on his second album Do or Die.

Singles
Two singles from the album were released; "Way 2 Fonky" a response to Tim Dog's West Coast diss "Fuck Compton", and "Jus Lyke Compton".

Critical response

Way 2 Fonky received generally positive reviews from music critics. Jonathan Gold of the Los Angeles Times wrote that "Way 2 Fonky" is a great-sounding rap record, with a giant, Jeep-worthy bottom and high, articulated, almost reggae-inflected rhyming. His lyrics celebrate the fun side of the mythical Compton experience where N.W.A.'s dwell on what could go wrong; his sleek, '70s-soul-style grooves, which he produces himself, swing, well . . . way fonky. And though he's easily as obscene as any of his peers, he seems actually to like women. Havelock Nelson of Entertainment Weekly wrote that Unlike those other rap quasars from Compton, N.W.A, DJ Quik doesn't just give us frightening images from Black Cali alleys. This near-platinum poet may involve himself in verbal gunplay and narrate a few violent street adventures, but on his sophomore set Quik is more concerned with getting paid and laid than with gang wars and bloodbaths. As he declares in "America'z Most Complete Artist," I don't go toe to toe, I go ho to ho. Quik's nasty, but he's no fool; he practices safe sex, 'cause HIV don't give a f--- about me. He's even willing to experiment musically and lyrically. Witness the sexually playful reggae track "Me Wanna Rip Your Girl," where he adopts a Jafakean (fake Jamaican) accent. On the album's other tracks, he throws his thin yet effective countrified voice against sampled grooves that for the most part bounce and shake like hard-core Jell-O. Ron Wynn of Allmusic wrote that DJ Quik proved his mettle with "Jus Lyke Compton," a definitive bit of regional touting that proclaimed West Coast rap the style-setter and all others followers. Whether or not you bought the line, you were hooked by the rap. Nothing else on the disc matched this single's intensity and wit, but it helped him earn a second straight gold LP.

Accolades
Chris Rock ranked "Way 2 Fonky" twenty-fourth on a 2005 list for Rolling Stone on the Top 25 Hip-Hop Albums of all time.

Track listing 

 signifies an co producer.

Sample credits
"America'z Most Complete Artist" contains samples of "N.T." by Kool & the Gang, "Remember the Children" by Earth, Wind & Fire, "The Big Bang Theory" performed by Parliament, and "No One Can Do It Better" by The D.O.C.
"Mo' Pussy" contains samples of "Shake" and "I Don't Believe You Want to Get Up and Dance (Oops)" by The Gap Band.
"Way 2 Fonky" contains a sample of "More Bounce to the Ounce" by Zapp.
"Jus Lyke Compton" contains samples of "Hook and Sling" performed by Eddie Bo, and "Wino Dealing With Dracula" performed by Richard Pryor.
"Quik'z Groove II [For U 2 Rip 2]" contains samples of "Africano" performed by Earth, Wind & Fire, and "Explain It to Her Mama" performed by Temprees.
"When You're a Gee" contains samples of "I Heard It Through the Grapevine" performed by Roger Troutman, and "UFO" performed by Richard Pryor.
"Niggaz Still Trippin'" contains samples of "Movin'" performed by Brass Construction, "Let's Dance" performed by Pleasure, "You Can Make It If You Try" performed by Sly & The Family Stone, and "Ffun" performed by Con Funk Shun.

Personnel
Credits for Way 2 Fonky adapted from Allmusic.

 2nd II None - vocals
 AMG - Vocals
 Robert Bacon - Vass, freakboards, guitar, producer
 Courtney Branch - executive producer
 DJ Quik - arranger, engineer, executive producer, freakboards, mixing, producer
 Playa Hamm - vocals

 Hi-C - vocals
 JFN - vocals
 Tracy Kendrick - executive producer
 Robert Lewis - photography
 Sexy Leroy - vocals
 Louie Teran - engineer, mixing

Charts

Weekly charts

Year-end charts

Certifications

References 

1992 albums
DJ Quik albums
Albums produced by Courtney Branch
Albums produced by DJ Quik
Profile Records albums
West Coast hip hop albums